Antal may refer to:
 Andal, 8th-century poet saint of South India
 Antal (given name)
 Antal (surname)
 6717 Antal, a minor planet

See also 
 Andal (disambiguation)